Emmanuel Anati (Florence, 14 May 1930) is an Italian archaeologist.

Biography
Emmanuel Anati was born in Florence in 1930 to Ugo and Elsa Castelnuovo, a family of Jewish origin.

In 1948, he got the scientific maturity in the "Righi" institute of Rome. He then moved to Jerusalem, where he graduated in archaeology from Hebrew University in 1952. In 1959, Anati specialized in anthropology and social sciences at Harvard University. In 1960, he earned a Ph.D. in Literature at the Sorbonne in Paris.

Anati has performed excavations and archaeological research in Israel (especially in the Negev desert), Spain, France, and other European countries. Based on the results of his discoveries in the Sinai Peninsula, Anati has become a supporter of the thesis that the Biblical Mount Sinai is not to be identified as Gebel Katherina, but as Har Karkom instead; he also believes that the Exodus should be placed between the 24th and the 21st century BCE, instead of the traditional date between 17th and 13th century BCE.

This identification has not gained acceptiance: Israel Finkelstein (who denies the historicity of the Exodus) described Anati's methods as "an anachronistic vestige from the 19th century", while James K. Hoffmeier (who supports the historicity of the Exodus, but in the traditional 13th century date) has stressed that "the type of Early Bronze Age cultic installations discovered at Har Karkom have also been found in significant numbers in the southern desert, Negev, and Sinai—so Anati's finds are not unique".

In the 1950s, Anati explored Val Camonica, whose rock carvings are one of the largest sites for rock art in Europe. In 1964 he founded the Centro Camuno di Studi Preistorici (CCSP) in Capo di Ponte, in order to study the prehistoric and tribal art and contribute to the enhancement of this cultural heritage.

In 1962, he married Ariela Fradkin.

Works 
Palestine Before the Hebrews: A History, From the Earliest Arrival of Man to the Conquest of Canaan, 1963
Mountain of God, 1986
Camonica Valley: A Depiction of Village in the Alps From Neolithic Times to the Birth of Christ as Revealed by Thousands of Newly found Rock Carvings, 1961
Camonica Valley, 1961
Evolution and style in Camunian rock art: An inquiry into the formation of European civilization, 1976
Les mystères du mont Sinaï, 2000

See also
Har Karkom
Rock Drawings in Valcamonica
Exodus: A Journey to the Mountain of God

References

External links 

  Dipartimento Valcamonica e Lombardia
  Biography on Articoli On-Line
  Biography on I personaggi della Valle Camonica 2007
  Biography on Camunia Tellus

Archaeologists from Florence
Hebrew University of Jerusalem alumni
Harvard Graduate School of Arts and Sciences alumni
University of Paris alumni
20th-century Italian Jews
Italian expatriates in Israel
Italian expatriates in the United States
Italian expatriates in France
1930 births
Living people